Capt. Bolesław Zajączkowski  (1891 in Kraków – August 17, 1920 in Zadwórze) was a Polish lawyer and reserve officer of the Polish Army.

Polish-Ukrainian War 
A former reserve NCO of the Austro-Hungarian Army, he volunteered for the Polish forces fighting in the battle of Lwów in the Polish-Ukrainian War. During the fights for that city against the forces of the West Ukrainian People's Republic he commanded a machine gun post at the so-called Execution Hill, a scene of particularly heavy fights.

After the successful defense of the city, he returned to civilian life only to rejoin the Polish Army after the outbreak of the Polish-Soviet War.

Polish-Soviet War 
During the Budennyi's assault on Lwów he was chosen as a commander of a volunteer battalion of roughly 330 men, mostly pupils and students.

Battle of Zadwórze] 
All but 12 men of that volunteer battalion perished in an 11-hours long battle of Zadwórze. For entire day the unit under his command withheld repeated attack by an entire cavalry division. After their defenses were finally broken, Zajączkowski committed suicide not to fall into enemy hands. For his merits he was posthumously promoted to the rank of Major and awarded with Virtuti Militari medal. After the war his body was one of five to be exhumed, identified and buried with military honors at the Lwów Eaglets' Cemetery in Lwów.

Polish Army officers
Lawyers from Kraków
1891 births
1920 deaths
20th-century  Polish lawyers